Prawle is a rural locality in the Fraser Coast Region, Queensland, Australia.

Geography
The Mary River forms the southern boundary and much of the eastern and western.

References 

Fraser Coast Region
Localities in Queensland